The following is a list of cast members who portrayed characters appearing in the movies and series of the Highlander franchise. As for the series, listed are, in chronological order, regular cast, recurring cast as well as guest cast credited in the opening credits. Guest actors credited in the closing credits are not listed.



Movies

Highlander (1986)

Christopher Lambert (Connor MacLeod) 
Roxanne Hart (Brenda Wyatt) 
Clancy Brown (The Kurgan) 
Sean Connery (Juan Sanchez Villa-Lobos Ramirez) 
Beatie Edney (Heather MacLeod)
Alan North (Lieutenant Frank Moran)
Jon Polito (Det. Walter Bedsoe)
Sheila Gish (Rachel Ellenstein)

James Cosmo (Angus MacLeod)
Billy Hartman (Douglas MacLeod)
Celia Imrie (Kate MacLeod)

Highlander II: The Quickening (1991)

Christopher Lambert (Connor MacLeod)
Virginia Madsen (Louise Marcus)
Michael Ironside (General Katana)
Sean Connery (Juan Sanchez Villa-Lobos Ramirez)
John C. McGinley (David Blake)
Allan Rich (Allan Neyman)

Highlander III: The Sorcerer (1994)

Christopher Lambert (Connor MacLeod)
Mario Van Peebles (Kane)
Deborah Kara Unger (Alexandra Johnson/Sarah Barrington)
Mako (Nakano)
Raoul Trujillo (Warrior)
Martin Neufeld (Stenn)

Highlander: Endgame (2000)

Adrian Paul (Duncan MacLeod)
Christopher Lambert (Connor MacLeod)
Bruce Payne (Jacob Kell)
Lisa Barbuscia (Kate MacLeod/Faith)
Donnie Yen (Jing Ke)
Jim Byrnes (Joe Dawson)
Peter Wingfield (Methos)
Damon Dash (Carlos Jones)
Beatie Edney (Heather MacLeod)
Sheila Gish (Rachel Ellenstein)
Oris Erhuero (Winston)
Ian Paul Cassidy (Cracker Bob)
Vernon Rieta (Manny) 
Adam Copeland (Road bandit)

Highlander: The Source (2007)

Adrian Paul (Duncan MacLeod)
Jim Byrnes (Joe Dawson)
Peter Wingfield (Methos)
Thekla Reuten (Anna Teshemka)
Cristian Solimeno (The Guardian)
Thom Fell (Giovanni)
Stephen Rahman Hughes (Zai Jie)
Stephen Wight (Reggie Weller)

Series

Highlander: The Series (1992–1998)

Regular cast

Recurring cast

Guest cast

Immortals

Mortals

Highlander: The Raven (1998–1999)

Regular cast

Recurrent cast

Guest cast

References

Highlander
Highlander
Highlander (franchise)